The Women's PGA Championship (branded as the KPMG Women's PGA Championship for sponsorship reasons) is a women's professional golf tournament. First held in 1955, it is one of five majors on the LPGA Tour. It is not recognized as a major by the Ladies European Tour, which does not recognize any of the three majors played in the United States.

Formerly known as the LPGA Championship, the LPGA (Ladies Professional Golf Association) announced in 2014 that the PGA of America would become a partner of the event, and that it would be renamed the Women's PGA Championship beginning in 2015—becoming a sister event to the men's PGA Championship (in a similar manner to the U.S. Women's Open being a sister event to the men's U.S. Open). The partnership included a new title sponsorship agreement with KPMG, an increase in purse, and a commitment by NBC to provide network television coverage of the weekend rounds.

The PGA of America partnership also allowed the tournament to be held at various top courses around the United States. Previously, the LPGA Championship had been usually held at a consistent location each year, most recently near Rochester, New York as part of a title sponsorship agreement with Western New York-based supermarket chain Wegmans.

Professional-amateur controversy
Prior to 2005, the LPGA Championship had a "professionals only" rule. This is similar to the men's PGA Championship, but contrasts with the U.S. and British Opens, which have long had both amateur and professional entrants through qualifying (henceforth the term "open"). Until its takeover by the PGA of America in 2015, the tournament was the LPGA's own event, and the LPGA was created specifically to provide opportunities for women in professional golf.

In 2005 this rule was revoked, effectively to allow 15-year-old amateur Michelle Wie to compete, in order to attract more media coverage and sell more tickets, though this was not publicly acknowledged by the LPGA. Some professionals objected to this move, as they felt that places given to amateurs would come at the expense of the LPGA Tour's less successful professionals, who need to play regularly to make a living. One of the leading professionals, Laura Davies, stated objections to the change were shortsighted.

At the time, Wie had made the cut in all five majors that she had played, with two top-ten finishes, and had also played twice in the Sony Open in Hawaii on the PGA Tour, but missed both cuts. Despite the controversy, she outscored all but one of the pros in the 2005 LPGA Championship and was the runner-up, three strokes behind three-time champion Annika Sörenstam.

In 2006, the LPGA Championship reverted to its "professionals only" status, with only pros in the field. Wie had turned professional the previous October, upon signing multimillion-dollar endorsement contracts with Nike, Sony, and other sponsors.

Tournament names
Tournament names through the years:

Winners

Note: Green highlight indicates scoring records.

Multiple champions

{|class="wikitable" style="font-size:85%;

| style="background: #FFFFCC"|Grand Slam winners ‡

|}

The defending champion has retained the title on seven occasions, most recently in 2015:
2015 – Inbee Park
2014 – Inbee Park
2005 – Annika Sörenstam
2004 – Annika Sörenstam
2000 – Juli Inkster
1984 – Patty Sheehan
1961 – Mickey Wright
Through 2022, three consecutive championships has been achieved only twice, by Sörenstam (2005) and Park (2015).

Sites by state

Future sites
Since the PGA of America took control of the tournament, venues will often bid for both a men's, women's, and seniors' PGA Championship together. Aronimink Golf Club, which hosted the men's in 1962 and seniors in 2003, was awarded a joint bid for the 2020 women's and 2027 men's. Congressional Country Club was awarded the 2025 seniors and both the 2022 and 2027 women's championships. Baltusrol Golf Club, which had hosted the 2005 and 2016 men's championships, was awarded the 2023 women's and 2029 men's championships together. The tournament will also be held at the PGA of America's new home in Frisco, Texas.

M = Denotes PGA Championship
S = Denotes Senior PGA Championship

References

External links

Coverage on the LPGA Tour's official site

 
LPGA Tour events
Women's major golf championships
Golf, Women
Recurring sporting events established in 1955
1955 establishments in Indiana